The Toronto Rock are a lacrosse team based in Toronto playing in the National Lacrosse League (NLL). The 2013 season was the 16th in franchise history, and 15th as the Rock.

After a strong 5-1 start to the season, the Rock went 5-5 the rest of the way, but it was still enough to clinch first place overall. In the division semi-finals, the Rock faced the western division's Minnesota Swarm who, because their record was better than that of the Buffalo Bandits, crossed over into the East division. The Swarm ended the Rock's season by defeating them 20-11 at the Air Canada Centre to advance to the Eastern final.

Regular season

Final standings

Game log
Reference:

Playoffs

Game log
Reference:

Roster

Transactions

Trades

Entry Draft
The 2012 NLL Entry Draft took place on October 1, 2012. The Rock made the following selections:

See also
2013 NLL season

References

Toronto
2013 in Toronto
2013 in Canadian sports